Major-General Ronald Albert Bramwell-Davis CB DSO (8 October 1905 – 12 May 1974) was a keen cricketer as well as General Officer Commanding Aldershot District.

Family
Bramwell-Davis was born in Scotland in 1905, the son of Captain Percy Bramwell-Davis and his wife, Evelyn Mary, the daughter of Albert Richard Tull of Crookham House at Thatcham in Berkshire.

Military career

Bramwell-Davis was commissioned into the Highland Light Infantry on 3 September 1925, after graduating from the Royal Military College, Sandhurst. He played for Berkshire County Cricket Club in the Minor Counties Cricket Championship in 1933. He served in the Second World War and then went on to be Brigadier with responsibility for Infantry matters in Asmara in Eritrea in the late 1940s. Returning to the United Kingdom, he was appointed Chief of staff at Southern Command.

Bramwell-Davis became General Officer Commanding (GOC) Aldershot District in 1956 and was appointed CB in 1957. He retired in 1960.

He was also Colonel of the Royal Highland Fusiliers.

Ronald Bramwell-Davis is buried in Aldershot Military Cemetery.

References

 

1905 births
1974 deaths
Graduates of the Royal Military College, Sandhurst
Scottish military personnel
Companions of the Order of the Bath
Companions of the Distinguished Service Order
Royal Highland Fusiliers officers
British Army major generals
Berkshire cricketers
English cricketers
Highland Light Infantry officers
British Army personnel of World War II
Burials at Aldershot Military Cemetery